Basket Swans Gmunden is an Austrian professional basketball club that is based in Gmunden. Their home arena is Volksbank-Arena Gmunden. The club has won the Austrian Bundesliga five times; the last championship was in 2021. To add to that, the Swans have won six national Cups as well. The main sponsor of the team used to be Allianz for a long time.

History

The team was founded in 1965, as the basketball section of "Union Gmunden". The first match of Union was played in 1966, it was lost 11–35. After six years, the team eventually promoted all the way to the 2. Bundesliga. Gmunden played seven years in the league, than promoted to the 1. Bundesliga.

The club had its golden years starting from 2003, since then the team started winning trophies in Austria. In 2005, 2006 and 2007 the Swans took the national title. In the 2007–08 season, the first European game of the Swans was played. The team competed in the ULEB Cup, the second tier of European basketball. Swans won the first game on the road against Hapoel Galil Elyon with 74:79. After it sensationally survived the regular season, the team lost in the Eight-finals against Joventut Badalona, the eventual ULEB Cup champions.

In 2014, the sponsorship deal with Allianz ended and the team was named just Swans Gmunden.

In the 2020–21 season, Gmunden won its fifth national championship after a 11-year drought.

Trophies
Österreichische Bundesliga: 5 
2004–05, 2005–06, 2006–07, 2009-10, 2020–21
Austrian Cup: 6 
 2003, 2004, 2008, 2010, 2011, 2012
Austrian Supercup: 8
2004, 2005, 2006, 2007, 2008, 2010, 2011, 2021

Season by season

Current roster

Notable players

 De'Teri Mayes (12 seasons: 1999–2011)
 Kęstutis Kemzūra (1 season: 2000–01)
 Darius Dimavičius (2 seasons: 2000–02)
 Ian Boylan (4 seasons: 2006–08, 2009–11)
 Robert Arnold (2 seasons: 2011–13)
 Sharaud Curry (1 season: 2011–12)

References

External links
 Official website 
 Eurobasket.com Swans Gmunden Page

 
Gmunden
Basketball teams in Austria
Basketball teams established in 1966
1965 establishments in Austria